Dowlatabad (also Romanized as Dowlatābād; also known as Daulatābād) is a village in Dowlatabad Rural District, in the Central District of Abhar County, Zanjan Province, Iran. At the 2006 census, its population was 440, in 107 families.

References 

Populated places in Abhar County